The Dongcang Bridge is a historic stone arch bridge over the Dongcang River in , Yixing, Jiangsu, China.

History
Dongcang Bridge was originally built in the Baoqing period (1225–1227) of the Southern Song dynasty by magistrate Zhao Rumai, but because of war and natural disasters has been rebuilt numerous times since then. The present version was completed in March 1997. In June 2006, it was inscribed as a provincial-level cultural heritage site by the Government of Jiangsu.

Gallery

References

Bridges in Jiangsu
Arch bridges in China
Bridges completed in 1997
Qing dynasty architecture
Buildings and structures completed in 1997
1997 establishments in China